This is a list of fictional fish from literature, animation and movies. This includes sharks and eels, both of which are fish. Cetaceans and seacows are aquatic mammals, not fish, and shellfish are mollusks, not fish, so they are therefore excluded.

Animation

Comics

Film

Television series

Literature

Myth

Video games

See also
 List of famous whales

References

Fish